Jeffrey Ian Clifford (born 12 October 1982) is a former English cricketer.  Clifford was a right-handed batsman who played primarily as a wicketkeeper.  He was born at Birmingham, Warwickshire.

Clifford made his debut in List A cricket for the Warwickshire Cricket Board against the Leicestershire Cricket Board in the 2001 Cheltenham & Gloucester Trophy.  His second and final List A appearance for the Board came against Leicestershire in the 2002 Cheltenham & Gloucester Trophy.

Clifford made his debut in first-class cricket for Warwickshire against Somerset in 2002.  During 2002, he represented the county in 4 first-class matches, the last of which came against Somerset in the County Championship.  In his 4 first-class matches, he scored 20 runs at a batting average of 3.33, with a high score of 7.  Behind the stumps he took 15 catches and made a single stumping.

Clifford also played List A matches for Warwickshire.  His List A debut for the county came against Yorkshire in 2002.  He played 3 List A matches for Warwickshire in 2002, but played his final match for the county in 2004 against Hampshire.  In his total of 6 career List A matches, he scored 13 runs at an average of 4.33, with a high score of 5*.  Behind the stumps he took 10 catches and made a single stumping.

References

External links
Ian Clifford at Cricinfo

1982 births
Living people
English cricketers
Warwickshire Cricket Board cricketers
Warwickshire cricketers
Cricketers from Birmingham, West Midlands
English cricketers of the 21st century
Wicket-keepers